Liptovská Teplá is a village and municipality in Ružomberok District in the Žilina Region of northern Slovakia.

History
In historical records the village was first mentioned in 1264.

Geography
It has a population of about 903 people.

References

External links

https://web.archive.org/web/20080111223415/http://www.statistics.sk/mosmis/eng/run.html
http://www.liptovskatepla.sk/

Villages and municipalities in Ružomberok District